Sebastián André Rojas Quesada (born 29 October 1999) is a Peruvian footballer who plays as a goalkeeper for Peruvian Segunda División side Deportivo Llacuabamba.

Career

Club career
Rojas is a product of Universitario. He later joined FBC Melgar ahead of the 2018 season. At Melgar, he played for the clubs reserve team, but was also on the bench for one professional game against Sport Boys in June 2018.

Ahead of the 2019 season, Rojas moved to Carlos A. Mannucci. He was mainly playing for the reserve team in his first season. Rojas got his official and professional debut for the club on 5 October 2019 in the Peruvian Primera División against Deportivo Binacional, which was lost 4–0. In the following season, he continued to play for the reserve team and act as reserve goalkeeper for the first team.

In January 2023, Rojas joined Peruvian Segunda División side Deportivo Llacuabamba.

References

External links
 

Living people
1999 births
Association football goalkeepers
Peruvian footballers
Footballers from Lima
Peruvian Primera División players
Club Universitario de Deportes footballers
FBC Melgar footballers
Carlos A. Mannucci players